The 2nd Daily Mirror Trophy was a motor race, run to Formula One rules, held on 14 March 1964 at Snetterton Motor Racing Circuit, England. The race was run over 35 laps of the circuit, and was won by British driver Innes Ireland in a BRP.

The weather conditions for this race were atrocious, with driving sleet and snow, and the length of the race was cut from 50 laps to 35. Three of the favourites were out of contention early in the race, as Jim Clark and Jack Brabham suffered badly from their cars being fitted with smaller wheels than the others, while Graham Hill had an accident on lap 6, aquaplaning into an earth bank while leading. Peter Arundell led from then until lap 22 when his gearbox failed, and after Jo Bonnier led briefly, Ireland took the lead on lap 26 and pulled away to take the victory.

Giancarlo Baghetti was unable to make the start after his car's engine failed while it was being practised by Phil Hill.

Results

Scuderia Ferrari had entered two cars, numbered 7 and 8, but withdrew before naming drivers. Brabham and Cooper entered cars given numbers 6 and 10 respectively, which were also withdrawn.

References

 "The Grand Prix Who's Who", Steve Small, 1995.
 "The Formula One Record Book", John Thompson, 1974, pp.174-175.

Daily Mirror Trophy
Glover
Auto races in the United Kingdom